Zavang-e Sofla (also Romanized as Zāvang-e Soflá; also known as Zāvang-e Pā’īn) is a village in Firuzeh Rural District, in the Central District of Firuzeh County, Razavi Khorasan Province, Iran. At the 2006 census, its population was 457, in 113 families.

References 

Populated places in Firuzeh County